The 1983–84 Australian region cyclone season was the most active season on record. It officially started on 1 November 1983, and officially ended on 30 April 1984.



Seasonal summuary

Systems

Cyclone 01S 

Cyclone 01S existed over the northwestern areas of the Australian region basin from 11 July to 15 July.

Severe Tropical Cyclone Oscar 

Oscar developed from a low-pressure area to the northwest of the Cocos Islands on 22 October. The storm moved generally southward for several days before dissipating on 1 November.

Tropical Low Pearl 

A low pressure developed into Pearl on 11 November. The system tracked southeastward and ceased to exist on 14 November. It was classified as a tropical cyclone at the time until post-analysis indicated it remained a tropical low.

Severe Tropical Cyclone Quenton 

Quenton developed on 26 November from a low pressure situated south of Java. Making landfall in Western Australia on 29 November, Quenton was the first tropical cyclone to strike Australia in the month of November since Ines in 1973. The cyclone dissipated on the following day.

Tropical Cyclone Fritz 

On 9 December, Fritz developed from a low-pressure area to the northwest of Willis Island. Fritz meandered erratically until dissipating on 13 December.

Tropical Cyclone Esther 

A small, weak tropical low, later named Esther, developed over the Banda Sea on 19 December. Esther struck Babar Island and then dissipated on 21 December.

Tropical Cyclone 06U 

Operationally, this cyclone was considered to have been the redeveloped remnants of Esther. The storm developed from a cloud cluster near the southern tip of Timor on 21 December. The system moved west-northward and dissipated on 24 December.

Tropical Cyclone Sharon 

A low-pressure area rapidly developed into Tropical Cyclone Sharon on 25 December. Sharon existed west of 90°E, which is now the western boundary of the Australian region basin. The storm dissipated on 31 December.

Tropical Cyclone Tim 

Tim formed from a low-pressure area to the southeast of Christmas Island on 2 January 1984. After moving northwest, Tim turned southward on 6 January. The cyclone decayed to a tropical low by 10 January.

Severe Tropical Cyclone Grace 

A weak area of low pressure developed east of Queensland on January 11. The tropical disturbance moved northeastward over the Coral Sea and gradually became better organized. On January 13 it turned to the south and intensified into a tropical cyclone the next day. In a favorable environment for intensification, Grace strengthened on January 15 and 16, developing a ragged eye as seen on the satellite images. On January 16 became a severe tropical cyclone and reached its lowest estimated pressure of 970 mb. Also on January 16, a weather station on Frederick Reef reported maximum winds of 130 km/h. On January 17, upper-level shear increased over the circulation and Grace became exposed as the tropical cyclone turned to the east. Weakening continued during the next few days and Grace decayed into a remnant low on January 21 while located southeast of Nouméa.

Severe Tropical Cyclone Vivienne-Fanja 

The origins of Vivienne-Fanja are unclear as a result of sparseness of data, due to a disruption in satellite imagery coverage. It is estimated that a tropical low formed on January 23 west of Christmas Island in the Australian basin. The Bureau of Meteorology named the storm Vivienne, which gradually intensified while moving to the west. On January 27, the cyclone crossed 80° E into the southwest Indian Ocean, at which time it was renamed Fanja.

Severe Tropical Cyclone Willy 

A weak area of low pressure developed south of Java along the monsoon trough on February 2. The system meandered for a few days while becoming better organized. Late on February 5, the Bureau of Meteorology upgraded the low pressure to tropical cyclone intensity. Willy moved southwestward starting on February 6 and continued to intensify. On February 7, Willy was upgraded to a severe tropical cyclone with an estimated central pressure of 975 mb. On February 8, Willy reached its peak with an estimated central pressure of 960 mb. Satellite images showed a well-organized tropical cyclone and an eye was intermittently visible. Strong wind shear caused Willy to quickly lose strength and it weakened below tropical cyclone intensity late on February 9. Early on February 11, Willy dissipated.

Severe Tropical Cyclone Annette-Jaminy 

Cyclone Annette developed simultaneously with Cyclone Willy in the Australian basin and Cyclone Haja in the south-west Indian. On February 3, a tropical low formed northeast of the Cocos Islands. Steered by a ridge to the south, it moved generally southwestward and intensified into Tropical Cyclone Annette, named by the Bureau of Meteorology. After executing a loop, Annette crossed 80 E into the south-west Indian Ocean on February 16. Upon crossing into the basin, the storm was renamed Jaminy by the Mauritius Meteorological Service.

Tropical Cyclone Harvey 

A low spawned within the monsoon trough developed into Tropical Cyclone Harvey on 3 February. The system moved generally east-southeastward and entered the South Pacific basin on 7 February.

Severe Tropical Cyclone Bobby 

Bobby formed within the monsoon trough to the northwest of Broome, Western Australia, on 17 February. Bobby moved southwestward for much of its duration and dissipated by 23 February.

Severe Tropical Cyclone Ingrid 

A tropical low developed into Cyclone Ingrid to the east of Innisfail, Queensland, on 20 February. Ingrid moved eastward and then east-southeastward by 23 February. The storm then curved southwestward and dissipated on 25 February. Ingrid brought strong winds and caused minor flooding in Cairns and Mackay.

Severe Tropical Cyclone Chloe 

On 29 February 1984 Chloe crossed the coast near Roebourne, Western Australia where three houses were destroyed and twelve others unroofed. Fifty people required evacuation as floodwaters from the Harding River rose to the lower steps of the Police Station. Parts of the Wickham High Schools were severely damaged and two buildings and a boat were destroyed in the Cossack/Point Samson area. The Dampier Yacht Club was unroofed.

Tropical Cyclone Ferdinand 

A weak tropical low intensified into Tropical Cyclone Ferdinand on 2 March. The cyclone moved eastward to east-southward and paralleled the northern coast of Northern Territory, until making landfall near Maningrida on 4 March. Ferdinand dissipated on the following day. Goulburn Island and the Miningrida area experienced minor damage.

Severe Tropical Cyclone Jim 

Cyclone Jim developed from a low just southeast of the mainland on Papua New Guinea on 6 March. The storm slowly deepened while heading generally west-southwestward. Early on 8 March, Jim struck Cape Grenville, Queensland. Jim left minor damage to vegetation and downed some large trees. After crossing the Cape York Peninsula, the system emerged into the Gulf of Carpentaria and later made landfall on 9 March at Port Roper, Northern Territory, which is just south of Numbulwar. Jim dissipated on the following day. A  boat was beach at Alyangula. Inland, wind gusts as high as  downed trees in the vicinity of the Roper River.

Severe Tropical Cyclone Daryl 

Daryl formed from a tropical low to the west-northwest of Christmas Island on 6 March. It trekked southwestward and entered the southwest Indian Ocean basin on 16 March, but was not renamed. On 18 March, Daryl entered the Australian region basin, but dissipated by 20 March.

Severe Tropical Cyclone Kathy 

Severe Tropical Cyclone Kathy was a powerful tropical cyclone that devastated the Sir Edward Pellew Group of Islands in March 1984. Originating from a tropical low off the southern coast of Papua New Guinea. Tracking westward, the system attained gale-force winds by 18 March before striking the Cape York Peninsula. After crossing the area, Kathy entered the Gulf of Carpentaria where environmental conditions favored significant development. By this time, the storm had been tracking towards the southwest and struck the Sir Edward Pellew Group of Islands later on 22 March before moving over the Australian mainland as a slightly weaker system. Once over land, Kathy rapidly degraded, losing gale-force winds within 24 hours; the storm dissipated over the Northern Territory on 24 March.

One person died and damaged totaled to 12 million.

Tropical Cyclone Lance 

Lance affected Queensland before dissipating on April 17.

Other systems 
During 30 January a shallow tropical low developed over the south-eastern Coral Sea. Over the next couple of days the system gradually developed further as it moved westwards into the South Pacific basin. The system was subsequently named Beti during 2 February, before it impacted the Loyalty Islands and lost its tropical characteristics during 6 February.

See also 
 Atlantic hurricane seasons: 1983, 1984
 Eastern Pacific hurricane seasons: 1983, 1984
 Western Pacific typhoon seasons: 1983, 1984
 North Indian Ocean cyclone seasons: 1983, 1984

References 

 
Australian region cyclone seasons
Aust
Tropical cyclones in 1983
Tropical cyclones in 1984